Ding Mocun (Hepburn: Tei Mokuson;  1901 – July 5, 1947), also known as Ding Lesheng, was a politician in the early Republic of China. During Japanese occupation, he was a prominent figure in the secret police of the collaborationist regime.

Early life 
Born in Changde, in Hunan Province, Ding was initially a member of the Chinese Communist Party, but later became a Kuomintang politician active in Shanghai.

Career
He rapidly rose within the Kuomintang hierarchy with the support of the so-called "Central Club Clique" led by Chen Lifu and by 1934 chaired the Research and Statistics Department, which was a cover for the Kuomintang secret police. However, when forced out of power due to numerous corruption scandals in a reorganization of the Kuomintang in 1938, he defected to the Japanese side along with Li Shiqun. Under the direction of Japanese spymaster Kenji Doihara, the two worked to create an intelligence and secret police security service, which was founded in April 1939 and whose headquarters was located at 76 Jessfield Road in Shanghai. This address contained holding cells, where suspected Communists and Kuomintang prisoners could be interrogated and executed.

Under the collaborationist Reorganized National Government of China led by Wang Jingwei Ding served in the Central Political Committee, the Military Committee, and the Executive Yuan of the Reorganized National Government. He later held the cabinet-level posts as Minister of Society and Minister of Transport in the Reorganized National Government and served at one point as governor of Zhejiang Province.

On December 21, 1939 he escaped an assassination attempt involving Zheng Pingru.

Arrest and death
Following the surrender of Japan and the collapse of the Reorganized National Government of China, Ding was arrested in September 1945 and charged with treason. During his trial, he pleaded that he had been serving with the Nanjing regime as a spy under the orders of Dai Li, the commander of Kuomintang secret service. He was convicted in February 1947 and executed in prison in Suzhou, Republic of China, on July 5, 1947.

References 
 
 
 
Ritter, Mana. Forgotten Ally: China's World War II, 1937–1945. Houghton Mifflin (2013). 
Yeh, Wen-Hsin. Wartime Shanghai. Routledge (2003). 
Wakeman, Frederic. Spymaster: Dai Li and the Chinese Secret Service. University of California Press (2003).

External links

1901 births
1947 deaths
Republic of China politicians from Hunan
Executed Chinese collaborators with Imperial Japan
Kuomintang collaborators with Imperial Japan
Members of the Kuomintang
People executed by the Republic of China
Politicians from Changde
Executed Republic of China people
Executed people from Hunan